Hyalochna allevata is a moth in the family Cosmopterigidae. It was described by Edward Meyrick in 1918. It is found in South Africa.

References

endemic moths of South Africa
moths described in 1918
Scaeosophinae